The 2015 BWF World Senior Championships is a badminton tournament which was held from 9 to 15 August at Helsingborg Arena in Helsingborg, Sweden.

Medal summary

Medal table

Medalists

Players who won multiple medals

References

External links
Tournament link

 
BWF World Senior Championships
2015 in badminton
2015 in Swedish sport
International sports competitions hosted by Sweden
Badminton tournaments in Sweden
August 2015 sports events in Europe
Sports competitions in Helsingborg